List of numerical computational geometry topics enumerates the topics of computational geometry that deals with geometric objects as continuous entities and applies methods and algorithms of nature characteristic to numerical analysis. This area is also called "machine geometry", computer-aided geometric design, and geometric modelling.

See List of combinatorial computational geometry topics for another flavor of computational geometry that states problems in terms of geometric objects as discrete entities and hence the methods of their solution are mostly theories and algorithms of combinatorial character.

Curves
In the list of curves topics, the following ones are fundamental to geometric modelling.
Parametric curve
 Bézier curve
 Spline
Hermite spline
Beta spline
B-spline
Higher-order spline
NURBS
Contour line

Surfaces
Bézier surface
Isosurface
Parametric surface

Other
Level-set method
Computational topology

Mathematics-related lists
Geometric algorithms
Geometry